This is a list of the first minority male lawyer(s) and judge(s) in Maryland. It includes the year in which the men were admitted to practice law (in parentheses). Also included are men who achieved other distinctions such becoming the first in their state to graduate from law school or become a political figure.

Firsts in Maryland's history

Law Clerk 

 First African American male to clerk for a federal judge: Larry S. Gibson (1967)

Lawyer 

First African American male: Everett J. Waring (1885)

State judges 

 First Jewish American male (Maryland Court of Appeals): Simon Sobeloff in 1952  
 First African American male (court of record): E. Everett Lane (1923) in 1957 
 First African American male (municipal court): Robert B. Watts in 1960 
 First African American male (circuit court): George L. Russell Jr. (1954) in 1966 
 First African American male (district court): J. Franklyn Bourne, Jr. (1948) in 1971  
 First African American male (Maryland Special Court of Appeals): David T. Mason in 1974  
 First African American male (Maryland Court of Appeals): Harry A. Cole (1949) in 1977  
 First African American male (chief judge of any Maryland court): Michael Waring Lee in 1984 
 First African American male (Chief Judge; Maryland Court of Appeals): Robert M. Bell (1969) in 1996
 First African American and openly gay male (Chief Judge; Maryland Court of Special Appeals): E. Gregory Wells in 2022

Federal judges 
First African American male (U.S. District Court for the District of Maryland): Joseph C. Howard Sr. (1955) in 1979  
First Asian American male (U.S. District Court for the District of Maryland): Theodore D. Chuang (1994)

Attorney General of Maryland 

 First African American male: Anthony Brown in 2022

Assistant Attorney General 

 First African American male: Harry A. Cole (1949) in 1953

United States Attorney for the District of Maryland 

 First Asian American male: Robert Hur in 2018 
 First African American male: Erek Barron in 2021

Assistant United States Attorney 

 First African American male: John R. Hargrove Sr. (1950) in 1957

County Attorney 

 First African American male: Larnzell Martin, Jr. in 1986

Maryland State Bar Association 

 First African American male president: Harry S. Johnson in 2003

Firsts in local history 

 Clayton Greene Jr. (1977): First African American male judge in Anne Arundel County, Maryland (1989)
 Everett Waring (1885): First African American male lawyer admitted to the Supreme Bench of Baltimore City on October 10, 1885
 Harry Sythe Cummings and Charles W. Johnson: First African American males to graduate from the Maryland School of Law (1889)
 George L. Russell Jr. (1954): First African American male appointed as a City Solicitor and Judge of the Supreme Bench of Baltimore City, Maryland
 Joseph C. Howard Sr. (1955): First African American male to serve on the  Baltimore City Supreme Court (1968)
 John R. Hargrove Sr. (1950): First African American male appointed as the Administrative Judge of the District Court of Maryland for Baltimore City (1971)
 George L. Rosedom: First African American male to serve as an Assistant State's Attorney for the City of Baltimore
 Michael L. "M.L." McCampbell: First African American male judge in Baltimore County, Maryland (1990)
 James R. Benjamin, Jr.: First African American male to serve as the County Attorney of Baltimore County, Maryland (2019)
 E. Gregory Wells: First African American (male) to serve as the Calvert County State’s Attorney
 William Davis, Jr.: First African American male judge in Cecil County, Maryland
 Anthony "Tony" Covington: First African American male to serve as the State's Attorney for Charles County, Maryland (2011)
 George Ames: First African American male judge in Dorchester County, Maryland
 Richard "Rich" Gibson: First African American male to serve as the State’s Attorney for Howard County, Maryland (2019)
 DeLawrence Beard (1974): First African American male judge in Montgomery County, Maryland (1982)
 Brian G. Kim: First Asian American male judge in Montgomery County, Maryland
 Victor Del Pino: First Latino American male to lead the Montgomery County State’s Attorney’s Office’s gang prosecution unit. He later became a judge.
 J. Franklyn Bourne, Jr. (1948): First African American to set up a law practice (c. 1950s) and serve as a Judge of the District 5 Court (1971) in Prince George’s County, Maryland
 Larnzell Martin, Jr.: First African American male to serve as the County Attorney for Prince George's County, Maryland (1986)
 James H. Taylor: First African American male to serve as the Assistant State’s Attorney and a Circuit Court Judge for Prince George’s County, Maryland. He was also the first African American male member of the Prince George’s County Bar Association.
 Alexander Wiliiams Jr. (1973): First African American male elected as the State's Attorney in Prince George's County, Maryland. He would later become a district court judge.
 Gerald Purnell: First African American male lawyer in Berlin, Worcester County, Maryland

See also 

 List of first minority male lawyers and judges in the United States

Other topics of interest 

 List of first women lawyers and judges in the United States
 List of first women lawyers and judges in Maryland

References 

 
Minority, Maryland, first
Minority, Maryland, first
Legal history of Maryland
Maryland lawyers
Lists of people from Maryland